Salem Township is one of the twelve townships of Ottawa County, Ohio, United States.  The 2000 census found 5,517 people in the township, 2,676 of whom lived in the unincorporated portions of the township.

Geography
Located in the southern part of the county, it borders the following townships:
Carroll Township - north
Erie Township - northeast
Bay Township - east
Rice Township, Sandusky County - south
Washington Township, Sandusky County - southwest corner
Harris Township - west
Benton Township - northwest

The village of Oak Harbor is located in the township's northwest.

The Portage River runs from west to east through Salem Township before emptying into Lake Erie.

Name and history
It is one of fourteen Salem Townships statewide.

Government
The township is governed by a three-member board of trustees, who are elected in November of odd-numbered years to a four-year term beginning on the following January 1. Two are elected in the year after the presidential election and one is elected in the year before it. There is also an elected township fiscal officer, who serves a four-year term beginning on April 1 of the year after the election, which is held in November of the year before the presidential election. Vacancies in the fiscal officership or on the board of trustees are filled by the remaining trustees.

References

External links
County website

Townships in Ottawa County, Ohio
Townships in Ohio